John 'Jockie' Jones (22 September 1898 – 23 September 1965) was an Australian rules footballer who played with Geelong in the VFL during the 1920s.

Johns made his debut in 1920 and was Geelong's Best and Fairest winner that year. After 59 games for the club he retired in 1926.

External links

1898 births
Australian rules footballers from Victoria (Australia)
Geelong Football Club players
Carji Greeves Medal winners
East Geelong Football Club players
1965 deaths